The Kearsarge House (earlier Kiarsarge House) was a grand hotel in North Conway, New Hampshire, United States, from 1872 until it was destroyed by fire on October 18, 1917. Its legacy is continued by the nearby Kearsarge Inn which has a clock from the original hotel. Samuel W. Thompson carried mail to the town and other areas including a route he started to Glen House, another grand hotel in the area, until a rail line was established in the area in 1871. As visitor numbers increased, the hotel was scaled up by Thompson who also acted as a promoter for the area.

References

Further reading
Conway, New Hampshire 1765-1997 by Janet Hounsell
The Grand Resort Hotels of the White Mountains by Bryant F. Tolles Jr.
August 9, 1873 menu from the Kiarsarge House restaurant

External links

Defunct hotels in New Hampshire
Buildings and structures in Carroll County, New Hampshire
Hotel buildings completed in 1872
North Conway, New Hampshire